Jharel Leandre Cotton (born January 19, 1992) is an American professional baseball pitcher for the Orix Buffaloes of Nippon Professional Baseball. He has previously played in Major League Baseball (MLB) for the Oakland Athletics, Texas Rangers, Minnesota Twins and San Francisco Giants. Cotton played college baseball at East Carolina University, and was drafted by the Los Angeles Dodgers in the 20th round of the 2012 MLB Draft.

College career
Cotton played college baseball at Miami Dade College in 2010 and 2011. After he was not taken in the 2010 Major League Baseball Draft, the Los Angeles Dodgers offered him a contract as an undrafted free agent, but he declined the offer and returned to Miami Dade. He was then drafted by the New York Mets in the  28th round of the 2011 MLB Draft, but did not sign and transferred to East Carolina University.

Professional career

Los Angeles Dodgers
After one year at East Carolina, Cotton was drafted by the Dodgers in the 20th round of the 2012 MLB Draft. He signed this time and made his professional debut with the Ogden Raptors. Cotton spent 2013 with the Great Lakes Loons, Rancho Cucamonga Quakes and Double-A Chattanooga Lookouts. Cotton missed the first two months of the 2015 season, recovering from a broken left wrist. He pitched in one game for the Great Lakes and four for Rancho Cucamonga before being promoted to the Double-A Tulsa Drillers. In late August, he was promoted to the Triple-A Oklahoma City Dodgers and tried out for a potential bullpen callup to Los Angeles. Between the four levels he appeared in 21 games (with 11 starts) and was 6–2 with a 2.45 ERA. The Dodgers added Cotton to their 40-man roster after the season. He began 2016 in the starting rotation for Oklahoma City and was selected to participate for the world team at the 2016 All-Star Futures Game. During the game, Cotton only faced one batter, throwing merely three pitches against Phillies outfielder Dylan Cozens. However, Cozens flied out, paving the way for Cotton to pick up the win after teammate Yoan Moncada hit a game-winning Home Run for the World Team.

Oakland Athletics
On August 1, 2016, the Dodgers traded Cotton, Grant Holmes, and Frankie Montas to the Oakland Athletics for Rich Hill and Josh Reddick. He was assigned to the Triple-A Nashville Sounds. Cotton retired the first 26 Round Rock Express batters he faced on August 9, but allowed a triple with two outs in the ninth inning, just missing a perfect game.
He was called up to the Athletics on September 7 to make his major league debut. Cotton began the season in the A's rotation but after starting off slowly he was sent down to AAA. He was soon after called up again but was sent down back to AAA. Cotton's splits between home and road were drastically apart, as at home he was 4–6 with 6.98 ERA while on the road he was 5–4 with a 3.94 ERA. On March 22, 2018, Cotton underwent Tommy John surgery and missed the 2018 season. In 2019, Cotton began his rehab by pitching for the Single-A Stockton Ports but was set back in May by a hamstring injury and elected to have surgery to fix the issue. Cotton returned to the mound in July and pitched for the Triple-A Las Vegas Aviators.

Cotton was designated for assignment on November 20, 2019.

Chicago Cubs
On November 23, 2019, Cotton was traded to the Chicago Cubs in exchange for cash considerations. On August 16, 2020, Cotton was designated for assignment. He cleared waivers and was assigned to the team's alternate training site in South Bend, but was released by the organization on September 5, 2020.

Texas Rangers
On December 14, 2020, Cotton signed a minor league contract with the Texas Rangers organization. On July 30, 2021, Texas selected Cotton's contract and promoted him to the active roster. Cotton finished the 2021 season with Texas, going 2–0 with a 3.52 ERA and 30 strikeouts over 30 2/3 innings.

Minnesota Twins
On November 5, 2021, Cotton was claimed off waivers by the Minnesota Twins. On November 30, Cotton signed a $700,000 contract with the Twins, avoiding salary arbitration. 

Cotton made two scoreless appearances for the Twins in 2022 before he was designated for assignment on April 13, 2022, when Dereck Rodríguez was added to the roster. He was sent outright to the Triple-A St. Paul Saints on April 20.

He was re-selected to the active roster on May 10, but designated for assignment on May 17, 2022. He cleared waivers and was sent outright to Triple-A on May 19. He had his contract selected again on June 3 and was returned to Triple-
A on June 6. He had his contract selected for a third time on June 8. He was designated for assignment again on August 2, 2022. He had his contract selected for a fourth time on September 11, 2022. On September 16, Cotton was designated for assignment.

San Francisco Giants
On September 18, 2022, Cotton was claimed off waivers by the San Francisco Giants. On October 20, he was sent outright to Triple-A and elected free agency on October 21.

Orix Buffaloes
On January 24, 2023, Cotton signed with the Orix Buffaloes of Nippon Professional Baseball.

Personal
His brother, Jamaine Cotton, pitched in the Houston Astros organization from 2010 to 2014.

References

External links

1992 births
Living people
People from Saint Thomas, U.S. Virgin Islands
Major League Baseball players from the United States Virgin Islands
Major League Baseball pitchers
Oakland Athletics players
Texas Rangers players
Minnesota Twins players
San Francisco Giants players
East Carolina Pirates baseball players
Miami Dade Sharks baseball players
Ogden Raptors players
Great Lakes Loons players
Chattanooga Lookouts players
Rancho Cucamonga Quakes players
Tulsa Drillers players
Oklahoma City Dodgers players
Glendale Desert Dogs players
Nashville Sounds players
Stockton Ports players
Las Vegas Aviators players
Orix Buffaloes players
Round Rock Express players
St. Paul Saints players